Erwin Dold (16 November 1919, in Wagensteig, part of the community of Buchenbach – 11 September 2012, in Buchenbach) was a fighter pilot in the Luftwaffe, despite the fact that he was not a Nazi Party member, then sergeant-major in the Luftwaffe ground staff, Commandant of the Concentration Camp Dautmergen, and director of the lumber company Dold Holzwerke in Buchenbach.

Early life
Dold was born in Wagensteig in the Black Forest region of southern Germany in 1919 and was connected to his family's lumber mill from his earliest years. The outbreak of World War II prevented him from officially joining the company and instead he was trained as a fighter pilot in the German air force, seeing action in France, Romania and Russia before being shot down over Crimea. He was seriously wounded and transferred to the ground staff in Freiburg im Breisgau after his recovery.

Soon after this he was transferred as commander to the concentration camp Haslach in the Kinzigtal and after its closure in the autumn of 1944 to the concentration camp in Dautmergen, one of the sub-camps of the Natzweiler-Struthof concentration camp. Its main purpose was the mining of oil shale, gained under grossly inhumane conditions.

Commandant at Dautmergen
The catastrophic situation of the inmates appalled the 24-year-old officer; the barracks stood on a swampy field and had no floor. The mortality rate, primarily from Typhus and Paratyphus stood at up to 50 dead per day. At Dold's request a sanitary inspection commission was called in to examine the hygienic and medical facilities, resulting in the transfer of the commandant.

On 7 March 1945 Dold himself became the camp commandant. He distinguished himself through his humane conduct, saw to it that prisoners received clothing and food and improved the hygiene conditions. In adventurous sorties he managed to procure food with the help of a small groups of prisoners he had organised to help him, and with the financial assistance of his father, who ran the family firm. When ordered by the Gestapo to organise a firing squad for the execution of 23 Soviet officers between 5 and 7 April 1945, he refused to do so. That same month the camp was evacuated, few remaining prisoners were liberated by the French army.

Dold gave himself up voluntarily to the French occupation army and was interned with 24 other defendants accused of crimes against humanity. On 1 February 1947, on the basis of witness testimony by prisoners, he was acquitted as the sole concentration camp commandant on the grounds of "proven innocence."

Post-war years
After the war, he joined his father's company, which he later took over. For over 40 years he remained silent about the events of the war until in 1990, he spoke to Dr Thomas Seiterich. A year later a documentary movie was made for German television by Manfred Bannenberg.

On 8 November 2002 Erwin Dold was made citizen of honour of Buchenbach.

In preparation for the film "Himmel und Erde" by Christian Schumacher with the French actor Gérard Depardieu situated in Schömberg he was able give sound advice for the film script. He is played in the film by Matthias Schweighöfer.

On 11 September 2012 he died in his home town at the age of 92.

Literature 
 Yveline Pendaries, Les Procès de Rastatt (1946-1954). Le jugement des crimes de guerre en zone française d'occupation en Allemagne, Peter Lang, 1995, p. 189.
 Thomas Seiterich-Kreuzkamp: Der Fall Erwin Dold. In: Michael Kißener (Ed.): Widerstand gegen die Judenverfolgung. Universitätsverlag Konstanz, Konstanz 1996, S. 261–283.
 Edwin Ernst Weber: Opfer des Unrechts: Stigmatisierung, Verfolgung und Vernichtung von Gegnern durch die NS-Gewaltherrschaft an Fallbeispielen aus Oberschwaben. Thorbecke 2009, .

Film 
  Manfred Bannenberg: Der KZ-Kommandant. Die ungewöhnliche Geschichte des Erwin Dold, Dokumentarfilm, Deutschland 1991.
 Christian Schumacher: Himmel und Erde, Deutschland 2012, mit Matthias Schweighöfer, Anna-Maria Mühe und Gérard Depardieu

Notes 

Nazi concentration camp commandants
Businesspeople from Baden-Württemberg
German Air Force personnel
1919 births
2012 deaths
People from Breisgau-Hochschwarzwald